The following is a list of notable deaths in December 1966.

Entries for each day are listed alphabetically by surname. A typical entry lists information in the following sequence:
 Name, age, country of citizenship at birth, subsequent country of citizenship (if applicable), reason for notability, cause of death (if known), and reference.

December 1966

1 
 Lewis Albanese, American soldier (Medal of Honor) (b. 1946)
 Peter P. Carr, Danish-born American politician, member of the Wisconsin State Senate (b. 1890)
 Bai Chongxi, Chinese general in the National Revolutionary Army of the Republic of China (b. 1893)
 Lewis Creber, British art director (b. 1901)
 Ernest Daunt, Irish Anglican Archdeacon of Cork (b. 1909)
 James Maguire, New Zealand rugby player (b. 1886)

2 
 Ralph Allen, Canadian journalist, editor, and novelist (b. 1913)
 Luitzen Brouwer, Dutch mathematician and philosopher (b. 1881)
 Giles Cooper, Anglo-Irish playwright and radio dramatist (b. 1918)
 Conrad Wilhelm Eger, Norwegian businessman (b. 1880)

3 
 Nikolai Kolli, Soviet architect (b. 1894)
 Byllee Lang, Canadian sculptor (b. 1908)
 Fritz Langford-Smith, Australian electrical engineer (b. 1904)
 Kui Lee, Chinese-born American singer (b. 1932)

4 
 Nicholas Afanasiev, Russian-French Eastern Orthodox theologian (b. 1893)
 Thomas Carey, American-born Irish cricketer (b. 1903)
 Crahan Denton, American actor (b. 1914)
 Renate Ewert, German actress (b. 1933)

5 
 John Irving Bentley, American physician burned to death allegedly caused by spontaneous human combustion (b. 1874)
 Luciano Fernandes, Portuguese footballer (b. 1940)
 Sylvère Maes, Belgian cyclist, two-time winner of the 1936 and 1939 Tour de France (b. 1909)

6 
 Mario Alicata, Italian partisan, literary critic and politician; member of the Chamber of Deputies (b. 1918)
 Laurence F. Arnold, American politician, member of U.S. House of Representatives from Illinois (b. 1891)
 James Paul Donahue, Jr., American heir and socialite (b. 1915)
 Juan Natalicio González, Paraguayan politician, President of Paraguay 1948-1949 (b. 1897)
 Hermann Heiss, German composer (b. 1897)

7 
 William Henry Hewitt, South African recipient of the Victoria Cross (b. 1884)
 Viola Jimulla, American chief of the Prescott Yavapai tribe (b. 1878)

8 
 Bill Bolden, American baseball player (b. 1893)
 Capt. Richard Gustav Borgelin, Danish military officer (b. 1887)
 Maury Bray, American football player (b. 1909)
 Arthur Byron Coble, American mathematician (b. 1878)

9 
 Lazarus Aaronson, British poet and lecturer in economics (b. 1895)
 Paul G. Blazer, American oil company executive (b. 1890)
 Morris Fidanque de Castro, Governor of the United States Virgin Islands (b. 1902)
 Brian Coleman, Australian rules footballer (b. 1932)
 Pelagie Doane, American children's books illustrator (b. 1906)
 Lloyd Klein, Canadian ice hockey player (b. 1910).

10 
 Zoltán Baló, Hungarian general (b. 1883)
 Hans Jørgen Hansen, Danish field hockey player, silver medalist at the 1920 Summer Olympics (b. 1879)
 Boris Koutzen, Russian-born American violinist (b. 1901)
 Gregorio López, Mexican writer (b. 1897)

11 
 Carleton Allen, Australian professor and Warden of Rhodes House, University of Oxford (b. 1887)
 Cliff Fannin, American baseball player (b. 1924)
 Richard Himber, American entertainer (b. 1899)
 John Hines, American boxer, competed in the 1932 Summer Olympics (b. 1912)

12 
 Dino Alfieri, Italian fascist politician and envoy to the Holy See and Nazi Germany (b. 1886)
 Nellie Briercliffe, English singer and actress (b. 1889)
 Bill Devan, Scottish footballer (b. 1909)

13 
 Jim Baker, English footballer (b. 1891)
 Nils Frykberg, Swedish runner, competed in the 1912 Summer Olympics (b. 1888)
 William Henry Gummer, New Zealand architect (b. 1884)
 Frank C. High, American soldier (Medal of Honor) (b. 1875)
 Ingvald Jaklin, Norwegian politician, MP (b. 1896)

14 
 John Atirau Asher, New Zealand tribal leader, hotelier, interpreter, racehorse owner (b. 1892)
 Víctor Andrés Belaúnde, Peruvian diplomat, President of the General Assembly of the United Nations in 1959 (b. 1883)
 Ronnie Byrne, Australian rules footballer (b. 1900)
 Emma Dunn, English actress (b. 1875)
 Verna Felton, American actress (b. 1890)
 Paul Galligan, Irish politician, TD (b. 1888)
 Carl Hermann Kraeling, American theologian and archaeologist (b. 1897)
 Alexander Lillico, Australian politician, member of the Tasmanian Legislative Council (b. 1872)
 Shailendra, Indian lyricist (b. 1923)
 Richard Whorf, American actor (b. 1906)

15 
 Major General Keith Arbuthnott, 15th Viscount of Arbuthnott, British Army officer (b. 1897)
 Sammy Beswick, English footballer (b. 1903)
 Walt Disney, American animated film producer and founder of The Walt Disney Company and Disneyland Resort (b. 1901)

16 
 Sven Bergqvist, Swedish sportsman, International Hockey Hall of Fame inductee (b. 1914)
 Charles Crawford Davis, American audio engineer (b. c. 1893)
 James Verne Dusenberry, American anthropologist (b. 1906)
 Alex Garrow, British politician, MP (b. 1923)
 André Herbelin, French fighter pilot during World War I (b. 1889)
 Ma Lianliang, Chinese opera singer (b. 1901)

17 
 Dan Heilman, American illustrator (b. 1922)

18 
 Hon. Tara Browne, British socialite and heir to the Guinness fortune; according to some sources, he was the inspiration for the Beatles song "A Day in the Life" (b. 1945)
 Joseph Cucchiara, Italian missionary priest (b. 1889)
 Gene Gauntier, American actress and screenwriter (b. 1885)

19 
 Jack Forsyth, American football coach (b. 1892)
 Carroll Gartin, American politician, Lieutenant Governor of Mississippi (b. 1913)
 Ollie Kraehe, American football player (b. 1898)
 Betty Kuuskemaa, Estonian actress (b. 1879)
 Aslaug Låstad Lygre, Norwegian poet (b. 1910)

20 
 Amram Aburbeh, Israeli rabbi; Chief Rabbi of the Sephardic congregation in Petah Tikva, Israel (b. 1894)
 Rupert Anson, English cricketer (b. 1889)
 Ali Asllani, Albanian poet, politician and activist (b. 1884)
 Doc Farrell, American baseball player (b. 1901)
 Albert Göring, German businessman and anti-Nazi activist (b. 1895)
 Oskar Lebeck, German-born American illustrator (b. 1903)

21 
 Erich Haenisch, German sinologist (b. 1880)
 Jack Itzel, American football player (b. 1924)

22 
 Pádraig Ághas, Irish independent politician and schoolteacher; member of Seanad Éireann
 Harry Beaumont, American film director (b. 1888)
 Lucy Burns, American suffragist (b. 1879)
 Sir Clarence Johnston Graham, 1st Baronet, British politician and nobleman (b. 1900)
 James Hill, British politician, MP (b. 1899)
 Robert Keith, American actor (b. 1898)
 Alice Holford, New Zealand nurse (b. 1867)
 Robert Hopkins, American screenwriter (b. 1886)
 Robert Keith, American actor (b. 1898)

23 
 J. Dallett Byers, American jockey and horse trainer (b. 1898)
 Heimito von Doderer, Austrian Nazi author (b. 1896)
 William Rush Dunton, founder of the American Occupational Therapy Association (b. 1868)
 Adrianus de Jong, Dutch fencer, medals at the 1912, 1920, and 1924 Summer Olympics (b. 1882)

24 
 Ernest Blackham, English footballer (b. 1898)
 Gaspar Cassadó, Spanish cellist and composer (b. 1897)
 Thomas Vincent Grant, Canadian politician, member of the Canadian House of Commons from Prince Edward Island (b. 1876)
 Tommy Jackson, Australian rules footballer (b. 1885)
 Donald MacGillivray, British colonial administrator, British High Commissioner in Malaya (b. 1906)

25 
 St. Elmo Brady, American academic, first African American to obtain a PhD degree in chemistry in the United States (b. 1884)
 Nick Dandolos, Greek-born American gambler (b. 1883)
 Arnold Harvey, Irish sportsman and Anglican bishop of Cashel and Waterford (b. 1878)

26 
 Ina Boudier-Bakker, Dutch novelist (b. 1875)
 Christopher Dahl, Norwegian sailor, gold medalist at the 1924 Summer Olympics (b. 1898)
 Noël Gallon, French composer (b. 1891)
 Herbert Gille, Waffen-SS commander (b. 1897)
 Boris Jacobsohn, American physicist (b. 1918)
 Husayn Al-Khalidi, Ottoman-born Jordanian politician, Prime Minister of Jordan (b. 1895) 
 Kalervo Kurkiala, Finnish Waffen-SS officer (b. 1894)
 Tony Lekain, French film director (b. 1888)

27 
 Ernest K. Bramblett, American politician, United States Congressman from California (b. 1901)
 Ernest Burgess, Canadian-born American sociologist and academic (b. 1886)
 Frankie Genaro, American boxer (1920 Olympic gold medal winner) (b. 1901)
 Herbert Lewis Hardwick, Puerto Rican boxer (b. 1914)
 William James, Australian rules footballer (b. 1900)
 Willis Laurence James, American musician and composer (b. 1900)
 Wivi Lönn, Finnish architect (b. 1872)
 Guillermo Stábile, Argentine football player and manager (b. 1905)

28 
 Victor Anfuso, American politician, member of the United States House of Representatives from New York (b. 1905)
 Frank Chodorov, American libertarian writer (b. 1887)
 Hjalmar Christoffersen, Danish footballer, Denmark national team, silver medalist at the 1912 Summer Olympics (b. 1889)
 Vincenc Makovský, Czech sculptor and industrial designer (b. 1900)

29 
 Russell Brain, 1st Baron Brain, British neurologist (b. 1895)
 Aaron H. Grout, American politician, Secretary of State of Vermont (b. 1879)

30 
 Pietro Ciriaci, Italian Cardinal of the Roman Catholic Church (b. 1885)
 Chase A. Clark, American politician, Governor of Idaho (b. 1883)
 Guy Earle, English cricketer (b. 1891)
 Christian Herter, United States politician, Governor of Massachusetts and Secretary of State (b. 1895)
 Henryk Gotlib, Polish-British painter (b. 1890)
 Arthur Lochhead, Scottish footballer (b. 1897)

31 
 H. Otley Beyer, American anthropologist (b. 1883)
 Pieter Geyl, Dutch historian (b. 1887)
 Charlie Hewitt, English footballer (b. 1884)
 Raoul Lévy, French film director (b. 1922)
 Walter Lingo, American businessman (b. 1890)

References

1966-12
December 1966 events